The University of Canterbury (UC) (postnominal abbreviation Cantuar. or Cant. for Cantuariensis, the Latin name for Canterbury) is a public research university based in Christchurch, New Zealand. It was founded in 1873 as Canterbury College, the first constituent college of the University of New Zealand. It is New Zealand's second-oldest university, after the University of Otago, itself founded four years earlier in 1869.

Its original campus was in the Christchurch Central City, but in 1961 it became an independent university and began moving out of its original neo-gothic buildings, which were re-purposed as the Christchurch Arts Centre. The move was completed on 1 May 1975 and the university now operates its main campus in the Christchurch suburb of Ilam.

The university is well known for its Engineering and Science programmes, with its Civil Engineering programme ranked 9th in the world (Academic Ranking of World Universities, 2021). The university also offers a wide range of other courses including degrees in Arts, Commerce, Education (physical education), Fine Arts, Forestry, Health Sciences, Law, Criminal Justice, Antarctic Studies, Music, Social Work, Speech and Language Pathology, Sports Coaching and Teaching.

History

Canterbury College, University of New Zealand, 1873–1960
On 16 June 1873, the university was founded in the centre of Christchurch as Canterbury College, the first constituent college of the University of New Zealand and was funded by the then Canterbury Provincial Council. It became the second institution in New Zealand providing tertiary-level education (following the University of Otago, established in 1869), and the fourth in Australasia. It was founded on the basis of the Oxbridge college system, but it differed from Oxbridge in that it admitted female students from its foundation. Its foundation professors arrived in 1874, namely, Charles Cook (Mathematics, University of Melbourne, St John's College, Cambridge), Alexander Bickerton (Chemistry and Physics, School of Mining, London), and John Macmillan Brown (University of Glasgow, Balliol College, Oxford). A year later the first lectures began and in 1875 the first graduations took place. In 1880, Helen Connon was the first woman to graduate from the college, and in 1894, Apirana Ngata became the first Māori-born student to graduate with a degree. The School of Art was founded in 1882, followed by the faculties of Arts, Science, Commerce, and Law in 1921, and Mental, Moral, and Social Sciences in 1924. The Students' Union, now known as the University of Canterbury Students Association, was founded in 1929 operating out of the Arts Centre of Christchurch Old Student Union Building, and the first edition of the student magazine Canta was published in 1930. In 1933, the name changed from Canterbury College to Canterbury University College.

College House, a student dormitory that maintains its old tradition by adopting the Oxbridge college system, broke away from Christ's College in 1957 and relocated to the Ilam suburb of Christchurch in 1966 as a hall of residence at the University of Canterbury. In 1957 the name changed again to the University of Canterbury.

Independence of the University of Canterbury, 1961–2010
Until 1961, the university formed part of the University of New Zealand (UNZ), and issued degrees in its name. That year saw the dissolution of the federal system of tertiary education in New Zealand, and the University of Canterbury became an independent University awarding its own degrees. Upon the UNZ's demise, Canterbury Agricultural College became a constituent college of the University of Canterbury, as Lincoln College. Lincoln College became independent in 1990 as a full university in its own right and is now known as Lincoln University.

Coat of arms

With the dissolution of the University of New Zealand, the newly independent University of Canterbury devised its own coat of arms, blazoned: "Murrey a fleece argent, in base a plough or, and on a chief wavy or an open book proper bound murrey, edged and clasped or between a pall azure charged with four crosses formy fitchy or and a cross flory azure."

An explanation of the arms appears on the university website, where it is explained that the fleece symbolises the pastoral, and the plough at the base the agricultural background of the province of Canterbury. The bishop's pall and the cross flory represent Canterbury's ecclesiastical connections, and the open book denotes scholarship.

As an institution of learning, the university's coat of arms does not have a helmet, crest or mantling.

The university's unofficial coat of arms was accompanied by the Latin motto "Ergo tua rura manebunt," which means "therefore may your fields prosper" (or: "remain unto you"). Because of the land holdings with which the Provincial Government endowed the early University, this was appropriate. When the coat of arms was redesigned, the motto was removed and now the motto is only used unofficially.

Relocation to Ilam campus

Over the period from 1961 to 1974, the university campus relocated from the centre of the city to its much larger current site in the suburb of Ilam. 1973 saw the university celebrate its centenary, during which the neo-gothic buildings of the old campus were gifted to the City of Christchurch, which became the site of the Christchurch Arts Centre, a hub for arts, crafts and entertainment in Christchurch. 1974 also marked the opening of the James Hight Library, which at the time, was New Zealand's largest university building. Ilam's three university halls of residence were renamed University Hall in 1974, and the student dormitory was used as the Athletes Village dormitory for the 1974 British Commonwealth Games hosted in Christchurch.

In 2004, the university underwent restructuring into four Colleges and a School of Law, administering a number of schools and departments (though a number of departments have involvement in cross-teaching in numerous academic faculties). For many years the university worked closely with the Christchurch College of Education, leading to a full merger in 2007, establishing a fifth College.

Post-earthquakes, 2010–present

On 4 September 2010 at 4:35 am local time an earthquake struck the South Island of New Zealand with a moment magnitude of 7.1 several aftershocks followed the main event, the strongest of which was a magnitude 6.3 shock known as the Christchurch earthquake that occurred nearly six months later on 22 February 2011. Although there was no serious injuries to staff or students on campus and only minor damage to buildings, the initial quake closed the university for a week, and  the library was shut for months while shelves were repaired and half a million books placed back on shelves. The Student Volunteer Army was a group of around 10,000 university students and others who worked over a period of months to help clean up liquefaction.

In the months following the earthquake, the university lost 25 per cent of its first-year students and 8 per cent of continuing students. The number of international students, who pay much higher fees and were a major source of revenue, dropped by 30 per cent.  In October 2011, staff were encouraged to take voluntary redundancies. As well in September 2011, plans were announced to demolish some University buildings that were damaged from an earthquake. 

By 2013, the university had lost 22 per cent of its students. However, a record number of 886 PhD students were enrolled at the University of Canterbury as of 2013. Other New Zealand universities, apparently defying an informal agreement, launched billboard and print advertising campaigns in the earthquake-ravaged city to recruit University of Canterbury students who were finding it difficult to study there. In 2013 the New Zealand Government also agreed to provide $260m to support the university's rebuild programme.

Student numbers were steadily on the rise, with a 4.5% increase in students enrolled from 2013 to 2016. International numbers also increased, nearing pre-earthquake figures at 1,134 enrolled in 2016.

In March 2016, Vice-Chancellor Dr Rod Carr said in The Press newspaper: "In 2014, [students] wanted to leave Christchurch and went to Wellington, Otago and into the workforce. Now we're retaining Christchurch school leavers and we're getting our fair share of provincial students, as well as attracting greater numbers from the Auckland region." "Living on or near the UC campus, and having a lifestyle that can take you from lectures to skifields in 90 minutes or the beach in 20 minutes, is much more appealing and affordable than living in Auckland."

In January 2017, the University of Canterbury released its campus master plan – 50 building and landscape projects proposed over three stages by 2045, the cost could exceed $2bn. In a comment to The Press, Rod Carr said that the plans were proof the university was moving away from the falling enrolments post-earthquake.

Administration

Governance

The university was first governed by a board of governors (1873–1933), then by a college council (1933–1957), and since 1957 by a university council. The council is chaired by a chancellor. The Council includes representatives from the faculties, students and general staff, as well as local industry, employer and trade union representatives.

The original composition of the board of governors was defined in the Canterbury College Ordinance 1873, which was passed by the Canterbury Provincial Council and named 23 members who might serve for life. Initially, the board was given power to fill their own vacancies, and this power transferred to graduates once their number exceeded 30. At the time, there were discussions about the abolition of provincial government (which did happen in 1876), and the governance structure was set up to give board members "prestige, power and permanence", and "provincial authority and its membership and resources were safely perpetuated, beyond the reach of grasping hands in Wellington."

Original members of the Board of Governors were: Charles Bowen, Rev James Buller, William Patten Cowlishaw, John Enys, Charles Fraser, George Gould Sr, Henry Barnes Gresson, William Habens, John Hall, Henry Harper, John Inglis, Walter Kennaway, Arthur C. Knight, Thomas William Maude, William Montgomery, Thomas Potts, William Rolleston, John Studholme, Henry Tancred, James Somerville Turnbull, Henry Richard Webb, Joshua Williams, and Rev William Wellington Willock.

Professor Roy Sharp assumed the position of Vice-Chancellor on 1 March 2003. In May 2008 he announced his imminent resignation from the position, following his acceptance of the chief executive position at the Tertiary Education Commission (TEC) which he took up on 4 August 2008. The then current Deputy Vice-Chancellor, Professor Ian Town, assumed the role of acting Vice-Chancellor on 1 July 2008. On 15 October 2008 the university announced that Rod Carr, a former banker and the CEO of a local software company, would begin a five-year appointment as Vice-Chancellor on 1 February 2009.

Council member and former Pro-Chancellor, Rex Williams, became Chancellor in 2009. Council member John Wood became the new Pro-Chancellor. On 1 January 2012, Wood became Chancellor after Williams retired from the role. In 2019, a new Vice Chancellor, Cheryl de la Rey, was appointed from the University of Pretoria, and Susan McCormack took over as Chancellor.

The following table lists those who have held the position of chair of the Board of Governors, chair of the College Council, and chancellor.

Campuses

The University of Canterbury has three campuses spread throughout the city of Christchurch:

The Ilam campus maintains three libraries with the Central Library housed in the tallest building on campus, the 11-storey Puaka-James Hight building. The Ilam campus is where the Faculties of Education, Health, Science, Engineering, Business, Law and Arts are based. The University of Canterbury Students' Association is based there in the Haere roa building. The Ilam Campus is home to cafes and restaurants as well as a pharmacy, bookshop, the UC rec centre and the UC Health centre.
Dovedale: The Dovedale Campus is 11 hectares (27 acres) and became a part of the University of Canterbury when the Christchurch College of Education (a specialist teacher training institution) merged on 1 January 2007. The Dovedale campus is located adjacent to the Ilam campus and is off Dovedale avenue. The campus consists of the old Henry Field Library, The Christchurch College of English, Ilam early Learning Centre and Hayashi and Sonoda student residences. The Faculty of Education also maintains a presence here.
City: The Christchurch City Campus is made up of the Christchurch Arts Centre and the Manawa building which is a part of the Faculty of Health. Music and classics are again taught from the Christchurch Arts Centre in the old chemistry building, and within the new Manawa building in Christchurch city health and education are taught. The city campus also includes the Teece Museum of Classical Antiquities – home of the James Logie Memorial Collection.

The university also maintains additional small campuses in Nelson, Tauranga and Timaru, and teaching centres in Greymouth, New Plymouth, Rotorua and Timaru. The university has staff in regional information offices in Nelson, Timaru, and Auckland.

Libraries
The UC Library was first established at Canterbury College in 1879. Today there are three libraries on campus each covering different subject areas.

Central Library

The Central Library – is housed in the iconic Puaka-James Hight Building which is designed in the brutalist style architecture.  In 1974, the old City campus library moved to the Ilam campus and was housed in the newly constructed James Hight building, originally named after former Canterbury professor James Hight. The building was renamed Puaka-James Hight in 2014, after the brightest star in the cluster Matariki, to reflect the growing strength of UC's relationship with Ngāi Tahu and the mana of Te Ao Māori at the heart of the university's campus. The University of Canterbury Central Library is the largest university library in New Zealand. The Central Library has collections of over 2 million physical items including books, archives, journals and a miscellany of other items that support research and teaching in Humanities, Social Sciences, Law, Commerce, Music, Fine Arts and Antarctic Studies.

 The Henry Field Library (named for the New Zealand Educationalist Henry Edward Field) on the old Christchurch College of Education site joined the fold when the university and Christchurch College of Education merged. However, the Education collection was incorporated into the collections within the Puaka-James Hight building, and Henry Field is now a library store at the campus off Dovedale Avenue.
 A separate Law library was established within the James Hight building, it was then relocated to the new Law building (Mere Mere). However, after the 2011 Christchurch earthquake it returned to the Puaka-James Hight Building and integrated into the Central Library collection. The Mere Mere Building still operates as the Law and Business Building however it is no longer home to the law library.

EPS Library

The EPS Library (Engineering and Physical Sciences Library) supports research and teaching in Engineering, Forestry and Sciences.  With the move to the Ilam campus, the Library was split. First the Engineering Library, and later the Physical Sciences Library, moving to the new campus however the old Physical Sciences Library closed and its collections moved to the Engineering Library now called the EPS Library.

Macmillian Brown Library

The Macmillan Brown Library is a research library, archive, and art gallery that specializes in collecting items related to New Zealand and Pacific Islands history. It holds over 100,000 published items including books, audio-visual recordings, and various manuscripts, photographs, works of art, architectural drawings and ephemera. The Macmillan Brown Library's art collection also has over 5,000 works, making it one of the largest collections in the Canterbury Region. Some notable items in its collections include copies of Māori Land Court Records, official and government documents from various Pacific Islands states, trade union records, and the personal papers of various Members of Parliament and government ministers. The library is named after John Macmillan Brown, a prominent Canterbury academic who helped found the library, allocated a large proportion of his fortune to the Macmillan Brown Library.

Student accommodation

The university has ten student residences throughout its Ilam and Dovedale campuses: five fully-catered halls of residence exclusively for first-year undergraduate students: Arcady, College House, Rochester and Rutherford, Tupuānuku and University Hall; and five other self-catered student accommodation houses which are home to both undergraduate and postgraduate students: Sonoda Christchurch Campus, Hayashi, Kirkwood Avenue, Waimairi Village and Ilam Apartments. The largest, Ilam Apartments, houses 831 students during the academic year. Some of the halls at UC have storied histories; Tupuānuku is named for the star of the same name that is connected to food grown in the ground in the cluster Matariki in Māori Mythology; Rochester and Rutherford is named for former alumni Ernest Rutherford and John Fisher Bishop of Rochester; while Arcady, previously Bishop Julius Hall, was founded by the first Archbishop of New Zealand, Churchill Julius; additionally, College House is the oldest residential college in New Zealand.

Field facilities
The University of Canterbury has the most field stations of any New Zealand university. The Field Facilities Centre administers four of these field stations:
 Cass Field Station – Provides a wide range of environments: montane grasslands, scrub, riverbed, scree, beech forest, swamp, bog, lake, stream and alpine habitats; all accessible by day trips on foot
 Harihari Field Station – Access to native forests, streams
 Westport Field Station – for study of the West Coast of New Zealand, particularly mining
 Kaikoura Field Station – Kaikoura represents an important transition zone for flora and fauna, particularly in the marine environment, with Kowhai bush and associated rich bird life close by.

The university and its project partners also operate an additional field station in the Nigerian Montane Forests Project; this field station stands on the Ngel Nyaki forest edge in Nigeria.

The Department of Physical and Chemical Sciences runs its own field laboratories:
 Mount John University Observatory at Lake Tekapo for optical astronomical research
 Birdlings Flat radar facility
 Scott Base radar facility
 Cracroft Caverns ring laser facility

The Department of Physical and Chemical Sciences also has involvement in the Southern African Large Telescope and is a member of the IceCube collaboration which is installing a neutrino telescope at the South Pole.

Teece museum of classical antiquities

The University of Canterbury Teece Museum of Classical Antiquities opened in May 2017, and showcases the James Logie Memorial Collection, a collection of Greek, Roman, Egyptian and Near Eastern artefacts in New Zealand. The Teece Museum is run as a part of the faculty of Arts. The museum is named for University of Canterbury Alumni Professor David Teece and his wife Leigh Teece, who donated a substantial amount of money to the city for earthquake recovery. The money was used by the university to install the classics and music school in the Old Chemistry building at the Christchurch Arts Centre.

The James Logie Memorial Collection was established in 1957 as a result of Miss Marion Steven, a Classics faculty member, donating Greek pottery to Canterbury University College. Steven established the James Logie Memorial Collection to honour her husband, who served as registrar of the college from 1950 until his death in 1956.

The Logie Collection includes a wide range of pottery, beginning with the Bronze Age cultures of Cyprus, Crete and Mycenae it also includes vases that come from Corinth and Athens, the islands in the Aegean, East Greece and the Greek colonies in South Italy and Sicily.

Student culture

Students' Association

The University of Canterbury Students' Association (UCSA) operates out of the Student Union Building named Haere-roa which serves as the main student activity centre. The original UCSA  Building was damaged in the 2010 and 2011 earthquakes and was subsequently torn down, it was rebuilt and completed in 2019, it is located on the Ilam Campus. The building is home to two bars, "The Foundry" and "Bentleys". The Association also runs several cafes and restaurants around campus.  Located in Haere-roa is the Ngaio Marsh Theatre, named for the former alumnus of the same name. Haere-roa hosts a number of student societies and organization offices.

The university's student population operates the main student magazine, Canta, established in 1930. There are 12 issues per year, which are distributed around the UC campus every second Monday during the academic year. The newspaper's offices are in the Haere-roa building. Canterbury's student population runs a radio station which began to broadcast and operate as RDU in 1976; it began FM frequency broadcasting in 1986. RDU acquired its present frequency of 98.5 in 2003.

Orientation Week
Orientation Week or 'O. Week' is the Canterbury equivalent of student orientation, held in the first week of the academic year at the university. 'O. Week' is organised by the University of Canterbury Students' Association and involves events, including various concerts, a comedy night, clubs day and usually a Crusaders rugby game scheduled during the week.

Clubs

The university has over 140 academic, sporting, recreational and cultural societies and clubs. The most prominent of these include the Student Volunteer Army, the University of Canterbury Engineering Society (ENSOC), the University of Canterbury Law Society (LAWSOC), the University of Canterbury Commerce Society (UCOM) as well as the largest non-faculty clubs such as PongSoc (University of Canterbury Pong Society), Motosoc (Motorsports Society), Lads without Labels, CUBA (Canterbury University Boardriders' Association), CUTC (Tramping Club), UC Bike, Opsoc, The Gentlemen's Club. CUSSC (Canterbury University Snow Sports Club, formerly the CU Ski Club prior to 1997) is the only university club in New Zealand to own a ski field lodge, located at Temple Basin Ski Field. The club runs many events to raise funds for maintenance of their lodge. The University of Canterbury Drama Society (Dramasoc) achieved fame for its 1942–1969 Shakespeare productions under Dame Ngaio Marsh, but regularly performs as an active student- and alumni-run arts fixture in the small Christchurch theatre-scene.

In 2011 the SVA was established in the aftermath of the Christchurch earthquakes. A student at the University of Canterbury, Sam Johnson, rallied fellow students to help support the clean-up from the devastation. The club has grown and today is the largest club at the University of Canterbury. In 2020, in response to the COVID-19 pandemic, the SVA supported the vulnerable with their shopping during the lockdown.

Lads without Labels is a not-for-profit charity dedicated to improving men's mental health in and around campus. On 5–8 October 2021 Lads without labels started the Project 72 fundraiser, a 72-hour relay on the University of Canterbury campus, which raised $12,000 for men's mental health; as well in 2021 Lads without labels organised a 24-hour backyard cricket marathon raising $45,000.

One major student tradition, the Undie 500, involved an annual car-rally from Christchurch to Dunedin run by ENSOC. The rules required only the use of a road-legal car costing under $500 with a sober driver. The 2007 event gained international news coverage (including on CNN and BBC World) when it ended in rioting in the student quarter of Dunedin and in North East Valley. ENSOC cancelled the planned 2008 event. The Undie 500 was replaced by the Roundie 500 in 2011. This event has the same principles but follows a route through rural Canterbury, returning to Christchurch the same day.

Academics
The University of Canterbury offers 147 undergraduate majors and 61 graduate degrees.  For the 2020 academic year, the university granted 2,257 bachelor's degrees, 1,003 graduate degrees, and 384 honours degrees. To graduate with a full-time undergraduate degree in the usual three years, undergraduates normally take four courses per semester. In most majors, an honors degree requires advanced coursework and a thesis – this usually takes an extra year. However, some undergraduate degrees that are also professional degrees, such as the Bachelor of Laws (LLB), Bachelor of Engineering (BEng) and Bachelor of Forestry Science (BForSc), typically take four years.

At the university, students may choose to study towards two bachelor's degrees in parallel and graduate. Working on two separate degrees at the same time – a double degree – allows you to finish some combinations in four to five years. The University of Canterbury also provides conjoint degree options, which combine two set degrees into a single bachelor's degree in four years of study. Conjoint degrees should not be confused with double majors, where students will earn a double major if their two majors lead to the same degree name and a double degree if their two majors lead to different degrees.

Size and composition

According to the UC Annual Report, at 31 December 2019 the university has a total of 18,364 students (14,891 equivalent full-time students). 11,621 of these are undergraduates, and 1,869 are international students. UC has a total of 826 academic faculty staff.

Following the earthquakes, the number of students enrolled at UC fell from 18,783 during 2010 to 14,725 during 2014, though the number of new enrolments increased in 2014. In 2016 enrolled student numbers rose to 15,564. Enrolment as of 2020 has reached pre-earthquake levels with a 18,364 students enrolled at UC.

Staff reductions and academic freedom issues
One resignation, which occurred in 2003, was by a staff member who complained about restrictions on academic freedom. In 2006, New Zealand's Green Party suggested staff eliminations were based on the university's profit targets rather than merit. The university eliminated over 100 jobs in 2010, the year prior to the earthquakes.

In 2007, New Zealand universities including the University of Canterbury were accused of taking an increasingly litigious approach to managing its staff and, despite having an array of human-resources managers, routinely engaged lawyers and employment advocates to handle even minor matters. The university's 2006 financial reports list $836,000 as having been paid out as compensation for employment-relationship problems. However, in its 2013 annual report (two years after the 2011 Canterbury Earthquakes), it is stated that the university spent $4.66 million in 2012 and 2013 alone on expenses associated with faculty and staff layoffs (severance pay, legal costs, etc.).

Supporting equity and diversity
In July 2019 the appointment of the role Rainbow Advisor provided support to the LGBTQ community. In 2020 the appointment of Darryn Russell was announced to manage a broader portfolio of Amokapua Pākākano | AVC Māori, Pacific & Equity.

However, in 2014, one faculty member chosen to receive a teaching award from the University of Canterbury Students' Association refused to accept the award because of his concerns about student racism and sexism at UC.

Rankings

In the 2017 Academic Ranking of World Universities (ARWU), UC was dropped completely from the world's top 500 universities. In the 2017 QS World University Rankings, UC was rated 214th overall in the world, and third highest among New Zealand universities. Its individual global faculty rankings for 2015/2016 were: 146th in Arts & Humanities, 161st in Engineering & IT, 211th in Natural Sciences, and 94th in Social Sciences and Management. By 2018, these faculty rankings had all fallen considerably, and as of the release of the 2019 world university rankings, the three major university ranking organisations, ARWU, QS and THE, had all placed UC squarely in the middle of the pack of NZ universities at fourth place overall out of eight institutions, and in one case just two numerical positions above NZ's fifth-place university in the nation's lower division. In the 2016–2017 Times Higher Education World University Rankings, UC was ranked in the world's top 400 universities, up from being in just the world's top 500 universities in 2015. By 2021, however, UC had fallen back into just the top 600. Similarly, ARWU dropped UC from the top 400 universities in 2018 to just the top 500 in 2019, where it has remained ever since.

The university was the first in New Zealand to be granted five stars by QS Stars. Unlike the QS World University rankings, QS Stars ratings are only given to universities that pay a fee; the programme is designed to give "those institutions that are not highly ranked or do not appear in the rankings an opportunity to reach out to their prospect students, to stand out and to be recognised for their excellence."

Notable people

Alumni
Since it was founded, University of Canterbury alumni have made significant and creative contributions to society, the arts and sciences, business, national New Zealand, and international affairs. The University of Canterbury's alumni include four New Zealand Prime Ministers, the father of nuclear physics and the mathematician who discovered the exact solution to the Einstein field equations of general relativity.

 Rita Angus – painter
 Ian Axford –  space scientist
 Michael Baigent – author and archaeologist
 Rosemary Banks – Ambassador to the United Nations
 David Beauchamp – civil engineer
 Rex Bergstrom – academic and economist
 Don Brash – Former Governor of the reserve bank of New Zealand and former leader of the opposition
 Eleanor Catton – writer and Man Booker Prize winner 2013
 Neil Cherry – environmental scientist
 Mark Chignell – academic
 Nathan Cohen – world champion and Olympic champion rower
 Judith Collins – Politician
 Michael P. Collins – academic
 Helen Connon – educational pioneer
 Michael Cullen – former deputy prime minister and minister of finance 
 Lianne Dalziel – 46th mayor of Christchurch
 Rhys Darby – comedian
 G. F. J. Dart – Headmaster of Ballarat Grammar School 1942–1970
 Peter Dunne – politician
 Brian Easton – economist
 Atta Elayyan – futsal player, murdered in the Christchurch mosque shootings
 Stevan Eldred-Grigg – historian and novelist
 Ian Foster – computer scientist
 Rob Fyfe Businessman and former Air New Zealand CEO
 Edith Searle Grossmann – writer and journalist
 Henry Hargreaves – photographer
 Rhona Haszard – artist
 Joel Hayward – academic
 Toby Hendy – science communicator
 Ken Henry – Secretary to the Treasury (Australia)
 Rodney Hide – politician
 Jock Hobbs – All Black captain
 Marian Hobbs – politician
 Catherine Isaac – politician
 Bruce Jesson – writer
 Jess Johnson – artist
 Roger Kerr – executive director of the New Zealand Business Roundtable
 Roy Kerr – Discovered the Kerr geometry; mathematician and physicist
 John Key 38th prime minister of New Zealand
 Howard Kippenberger, military leader
 Jordan Luck – musician
 Christopher Luxon –Leader of the Opposition (New Zealand) and Former CEO of Air New Zealand 
 Euan Macleod – painter
 Margaret Mahy – Author of children's and young adult books
 Ngaio Marsh – Crime writer and theatre director
 Julie Maxton – academic administrator
 John McMillan – economist
 Colleen Mills – communications professor
 Trevor Moffitt – painter
 Mike Moore – 34th prime minister of New Zealand and director-general of the World Trade Organisation
 Stuart Nash – Politician
 Sam Neill – actor
 Craig Nevill-Manning – engineer
 Sir Āpirana Ngata – First Māori to complete a degree at a New Zealand university; lawyer and statesman
 William Orange – Anglican churchman and founder of Latimer House.
 Graham Panckhurst – High Court Judge
 Thomas Paulay – earthquake engineer
 Bill Pickering – engineering administrator
 J. G. A. Pocock – historian
 Nigel Priestley – earthquake engineer
 Kieran Read – Former captain of the All Blacks, New Zealand's national rugby union team
 Ivor Richardson – President of the Court of Appeal of New Zealand
 Ruth Richardson – Lawyer and former minister of finance
 Michelle Rogan-Finnemore — geologist, legal expert, Antarctic program manager
 Bill Rowling – 30th prime minister of New Zealand
 Theia (singer) – musician
 Ernest Rutherford – Physicist and Nobel laureate in chemistry
 Graham Cecil Scott,  – economist,  government official, international consultant 
 Feleti Vakaʻuta Sevele – 14th prime minister of Tonga
 Jenny Shipley – 36th prime minister of New Zealand
 Nick Smith – politician
 Kevin Smith – actor
 John Storey – rower
 Margaret Thomson — film director
 Sir Andrew Tipping former Justice of the Supreme Court of New Zealand
 Anote Tong 4th president of Kiribati
 Vincent Ward – film director and screenwriter
 Ada Wells – feminist
 Murray C. Wells – Professor of Accounting at the University of Sydney
 Dora Wilcox – poet
 Nicola Willis – politician
 Cal Wilson – comedian and television personality
 Glenn Wilson – psychologist
 John Young – Professor of Composition, De Montfort University, Leicester
 William Young – Justice of the Supreme Court of New Zealand
 Beatrice Tinsley – Astronomer

Faculty

 Alexander Bickerton – chemist
 Anne-Marie Brady – political scientist
 Alice Candy – historian
 Denis Dutton – philosopher
 Jan Evans-Freeman – electrical engineer
 Juliet Gerrard – biochemist
 Clive Granger – Nobel Memorial Prize in Economic Sciences, Erskine Fellow
 Robert Grubbs – Nobel Memorial Prize in Chemistry, Erskine Fellow
 Elizabeth Herriott – botanist and first woman appointed lecturer
 Susan Krumdieck – energy transition engineering
 Henrietta Mondry – specialist in Russian culture
 Karl Popper – philosopher
 Arthur Prior – philosopher
 Duncan Webb – Politician and Lawyer

Honorary doctors

Since 1962, the University of Canterbury has been awarding honorary doctorates. In many years, no awards were made, but in most years, multiple doctorates were awarded. The highest number of honorary doctorates was awarded in 1973, when there were seven recipients.

Popular culture

Film

 Heavenly Creatures (1994) Based on the Parker–Hulme murder case, Juliet Hulme (later known as Anne Perry) was the daughter of Henry Hulme, the rector of the University of Canterbury, and she and Pauline Parker murdered Honorah Parker, Pauline's mother. During this period Juliet and her family lived on campus in the Ilam homestead (now the University of Canterbury Staff Club), where filming for the movie took place.

References

Sources

Hight, J., Candy, A. M. F., & Canterbury College. (1927). A short history of the Canterbury College (University of New Zealand): With a register of graduates and associates of the college. Whitcombe and Tombs.

External links

 
 UC Spark
 Canterbury College and the New Zealand University in Christchurch (1885 article)

 
Canterbury
Film schools in New Zealand
Educational institutions established in 1873
1873 establishments in New Zealand